The Devil's Discus is an investigation into the death of King Ananda Mahidol (Rama VIII) of Siam (later Thailand) by English-South African author Rayne Kruger.

Book summary
The book comprises four main sections which are each further divided into chapters. The section "Before" serves as an introduction to King Ananda's death, to Siam and to King Ananda's background.

The next section "The Life and Death of Ananda" is ten chapters in length and details the main events of King Ananda's life, from his birth in Heidelberg in 1925 to his death by a single gunshot in mysterious circumstances at Bangkok's Royal Palace on 9 June 1946. This section introduces the main characters surrounding Ananda throughout his life and who subsequently become subjects for investigation following his death.

The third section "The Trial" has eight chapters and summarises the events and arguments of the subsequent regicide trial against three Palace officials, including two appeals the trial lasted more than six years and resulted in the execution of all three defendants in 1955.

The final section "Who Killed Ananda?" is Kruger's own analysis of the evidence surrounding Ananda's death, leading him to the conclusion that the only satisfactory explanation is suicide. He supports this theory with the revelation of a love affair between the young King and a fellow law student in Switzerland, Marylene Ferrari, a relationship which would not have been acceptable to Siam's royalist institutions.

Publication history
The Devil's Discus was first published in 1964 by Cassell. The Thai government banned the book as soon as it was published and Kruger was banned from further entry to Thailand.

A Thai translation of the book titled Kongchak Pisat (Thai: กงจักรปีศาจ) by Chalit Chaisithiwet (Thai: ร.อ.ชลิต ชัยสิทธิเวช) was produced for submission as evidence in a 1970 defamation lawsuit brought by Pridi Banomyong against MR Kukrit Pramoj and his newspaper Siam Rath. The translator was the elder brother of Pridi's secretary, Vacharachai Chaisithiwet. It was secretly published by two Thammasat students in 1974 and reprinted in 1977, and circulated behind closed doors in Thailand. A local printing house involved with this Thai edition was burnt down. This translation was eventually officially banned in May 2006.

Through the organisation Freedom Against Censorship Thailand (FACT), the English text was reprinted in November 2009 by DMP Publications, Hong Kong.

Critical discussion
In 2011, journalist Andrew MacGregor Marshall published an online article in which he describes the genesis of The Devil's Discus: "Krueger wrote it on the suggestion of Prince Subhasvasti, brother of Prajadhipok’s wife Queen Rambhai..... [Subhasvasti] came to trust and respect Pridi as a result of their wartime cooperation...... He believed –  that Pridi did something to do with Ananda’s death. The Devil’s Discus was envisaged as a way of rehabilitating Pridi’s reputation in the hope that he would be able to return from exile and play a leading role in Thai politics once again."

Marshall's view is that an explanation of Ananda's death is by Pridi, hence he goes on to say "Krueger’s book, published in 1964 after extensive research and considerable assistance from Subhasvasti, in his opinion had the purpose of demolishing the case against Pridi. The  problem was that an alternative explanation for Ananda’s death had to be provided. And to conclude that Bhumibol was responsible was, of course, totally unacceptable to the royalist establishment – the book was supposed to enable détente between Rama IX and Pridi, not to declare full-scale war. So Krueger had to find a way to discard the likeliest explanation – that Bhumibol shot his brother – and promote the only credible alternative conclusion, suicide."

See also
 Censorship in Thailand

References

1964 non-fiction books
Cassell (publisher) books
Censored books
Non-fiction crime books
Books about murder
Censorship in Thailand